This is a list of the main career statistics of Swiss former professional tennis player Martina Hingis.

Significant finals

Grand Slam finals

Singles: 12 finals (5 titles, 7 runner-ups)

Doubles: 16 finals (13 titles, 3 runner-ups)
By winning the 1998 US Open title, Hingis completed the doubles Career Grand Slam. She became the 17th female player in history to achieve this.

Mixed doubles: 7 finals (7 titles)
By winning the 2016 French Open title, Hingis completed the mixed doubles Career Grand Slam. She became the 7th female player in history to achieve this.

Olympics

Doubles (1 silver medal)

WTA Tour Championships

Singles: 4 finals (2 titles, 2 runner-ups)

(i) = Indoor

Doubles: 3 finals (3 titles)

Tier I / Premier Mandatory & Premier 5 finals

Singles: 27 finals (17 titles, 10 runner-ups)

Doubles: 35 (26 titles, 9 runner-ups)

WTA finals

Singles: 69 (43 titles, 25 runner-ups)

Doubles: 86 (64 titles, 22 runner-ups)

Team competition: 3 (1 title, 2 runner-ups)

ITF Circuit finals

Singles: 3 finals (2 titles, 1 runner-up)

Doubles: 1 final (1 title)

Junior Grand Slam tournament finals

Singles: 4 finals (3 titles, 1 runner-up)

Doubles: 1 final (1 title)

Performance timelines

Singles 

1 Including Fed Cup 2015 (0–2); Fed Cup record at least World Group II: 10–2
2 If ITF women's circuit (Hardcourt: 12–2; Carpet: 6–1) and Fed Cup (10–2) participations are included, overall win–loss record stands at 548–135.

Doubles
Only Main Draw results in WTA Tour, Grand Slam Tournaments and Olympic Games (no Fed Cup) are included in win–loss records.

This table is current through the 2017 WTA Finals.

Mixed doubles

Fed Cup
Levels of Fed Cup in which Switzerland did not compete in a particular year are marked "Not Participating" or "NP".

WTA tour career earnings 

*: As of: 20 March 2017

Career Grand Slam seedings

Head-to-head vs. top 10 ranked players

Top 10 wins

Longest winning streaks

37-match win streak (1997)

26-match Grand Slam win streak (1997–98)

External links 
 
 
 
 

Hingis, Martina